The 2010 Rally Japan, was the 10th round of the 2010 World Rally Championship (WRC) season. The 26 stage gravel rally took place on 9 – 12 September 2010 and was based in the city of Sapporo. The rally featured eight super specials at the Sapporo Dome with the rally finishing at the Dome on the Sunday afternoon.

Sébastien Ogier took the second WRC victory of his career, capitalising on a broken damper for Petter Solberg which dropped him out of the lead on the final morning of the rally. Ogier also cut into teammate Sébastien Loeb's championship lead, reducing it to 43 points before their home event in France.

Introduction
Prior to the rally, depending on results, Sébastien Loeb could have clinched his seventh consecutive world title with three events to spare. With a 58-point lead over teammate Sébastien Ogier pre-rally, Loeb had to outscore Ogier by 18 points in order to secure the championship, as well as beating Ford's Jari-Matti Latvala by 2 points, as the Finnish driver was 74 points behind Loeb. Petter Solberg and Dani Sordo were still in mathematical contention but would have to finish in the top two placings in Japan, with Loeb failing to score, to stay in contention.

Results

Event standings

Special stages

Standings after the rally

Drivers' Championship standings

Manufacturers' Championship standings

References

External links 
 The official website for the rally
 The official website of the World Rally Championship
 Results at eWRC.com

Japan
Rally Japan
Rally
September 2010 sports events in Japan